Jean-Luc Verger (born 28 May 1952) is a French male canoeist who won two world championships in C1 at individual senior level at the Wildwater Canoeing World Championships.

References

External links
 Jean-Luc Verger at Aifck

1952 births
Living people
French male canoeists
Place of birth missing (living people)